Who Is Gary Burton? is an album by vibraphonist Gary Burton recorded in 1962 and released on the RCA label. Some of the musicians who appear are alto saxophonist Phil Woods, trombonist Bob Brookmeyer, trumpeter Clark Terry, pianist Tommy Flanagan, bassist John Neves and drummer Joe Morello.

Reception 
The Allmusic review by Ken Dryden stated: "The talented young vibraphonist had already proven himself as a sideman and was breaking new ground as a master technician on his instrument, utilizing four mallets simultaneously with seemingly little effort".

Track listing
 "Storm" (Chris Swansen) - 4:12 
 "I've Just Seen Her" (Lee Adams, Charles Strouse) - 4:15 
 "Fly Time Fly (Sigh)" (Michael Gibbs) - 4:31 
 "Conception" (George Shearing) - 4:01 
 "Get Away Blues" (Swansen) - 5:40 
 "My Funny Valentine" (Lorenz Hart, Richard Rodgers) - 5:22 
 "One Note" (Jaki Byard) - 5:20 
Recorded at RCA Victor's Studio A in New York City on September 14, (tracks 1 & 7) and 15 (tracks 2-6), 1962.

Personnel 
 Gary Burton — vibraphone
 Clark Terry — trumpet 
 Bob Brookmeyer — valve trombone (tracks 1 & 7) 
 Phil Woods — alto saxophone 
 Tommy Flanagan — piano 
 John Neves — bass  
 Joe Morello (tracks 1 & 7), Chris Swansen (tracks 2-6) — drums

References 

RCA Records albums
Gary Burton albums
1963 albums